V. P. Sivasubramani is an Indian politician who was a member of the Tamilnadu Legislative Assembly. He represented Modakuruchi Constituency, Erode district between the years 2016 and 2021. He was also the District General Secretary of AIADMK and Joint Secretary of all World MGR Forum.

References

Indian politicians
All India Anna Dravida Munnetra Kazhagam politicians
Living people
Year of birth missing (living people)
Tamil Nadu MLAs 2016–2021
Tamil Nadu politicians